Schriever is a census-designated place (CDP) in Terrebonne Parish, Louisiana, United States. The population was 6,7111 in 2020. It is part of the Houma–Bayou Cane–Thibodaux metropolitan statistical area.

The place name was for railroad official John George Schriever (1844–1898), in connection with the 1870s opening of the rail line to Houma.

Geography
According to the United States Census Bureau, the CDP has a total area of 14.4 square miles (37.4 km), of which 14.4 square miles (37.2 km) is land and 0.1 square mile (0.2 km) (0.42%) is water.

Amtrak's Sunset Limited train has a stop in Schriever.

Demographics

As of the 2020 United States census, there were 6,711 people, 2,584 households, and 1,550 families residing in the CDP.

Notable people
 Sherman A. Bernard (1925–2012), Louisiana insurance commissioner, 1972–88, was born in Schriever.
 Henry S. Thibodaux (in office 1824), former governor of Louisiana, owned a plantation nearby and is buried at Halfway Cemetery in nearby Gray.

See also
 Schriever station (Amtrak)

References

External links
 

Census-designated places in Louisiana
Census-designated places in Terrebonne Parish, Louisiana
Census-designated places in Houma – Thibodaux metropolitan area